The Stolen Years is a 2013 romance and dramatic film directed by Wong Chun-chun and starring Bai Baihe, Joseph Chang and Christine Fan.

Plot
He-Mann (Bai Baihe) lost her memories five years ago when she had an accident. When she finally woke up, she could not understand why she and her husband had divorced, why her best friend is now her enemy, or why colleagues all avoided and tried to stay away from her. In order to learn about her past, she starts on her search of her lost memories with the help of her ex-husband. But as they discover more, they then realise.

Cast
 Bai Baihe
 Joseph Chang
 Christine Fan
 Amber An
 Ken Lin
 Tse Kwan-ho
 Queenie Tai
 Sky Wu

Critical reception
Andrew Chan of the Film Critics Circle of Australia writes, "While it does not feel as realistic as say her best works (“Break Up Club”), this is an easy film to take as it engages without being pretentious and emotes without extravagance."

References

2013 films
Chinese romantic drama films
Films directed by Wong Chun-chun